Crassispira aegis is an extinct species of sea snail, a marine gastropod mollusk in the family Pseudomelatomidae, the turrids and allies.

Description
The length of the shell attains 45.8 mm; its diameter 13.6 mm.

Distribution
Fossils have been found in Pliocene strata of the Bowden Formation of Jamaica; also on Saint Thomas; age range: 3.6 to 2.588 Ma

References

 W. P. Woodring. 1928. Miocene Molluscs from Bowden, Jamaica. Part 2: Gastropods and discussion of results. Contributions to the Geology and Palaeontology of the West Indies. Contributions to the Geology and Palaeontology of the West Indies
 W. P. Woodring. 1970. Geology and paleontology of canal zone and adjoining parts of Panama: Description of Tertiary mollusks (gastropods: Eulimidae, Marginellidae to Helminthoglyptidae). United States Geological Survey Professional Paper 306(D):299–452

External links
 Fossilworks : Crassispira aegis

aegis
Gastropods described in 1928